Doc Sanchez Field is a baseball venue located in Laredo, Texas and the home of the Laredo Community College Palominos baseball team. The field was named after Crispin "Doc" Sanchez.

References

Sports venues in Laredo, Texas